The Truth is the debut solo album by American R&B singer Aaron Hall, lead singer of Guy. The album reached #7 on Billboard's Top R&B Albums, #47 on the Billboards 200, and scored five hit singles: "Don't Be Afraid", "Get a Little Freaky with Me", "Let's Make Love", "I Miss You" and "When You Need Me".

"I Miss You" was the biggest pop hit from the album, peaking at #14 on Billboards Hot 100 and Don't Be Afraid peaked #1 on Billboards Top R&B Songs chart, a number-one hit for two consecutive weeks.

Track listing

Notes
Tracks 4 and 5 contain sample from "Four Play" (George Clinton Jr./Glenn Goins/Bootsy Collins) Bridgeport Music Inc. (BMI)/Rubber Band Music, Inc. (BMI) used by permission. Courtesy of Warner Special Products

Credits
Coordinator [Production] – Felicia Newsome (tracks: 3)
Executive-Producer – Louis Silas Jr.
Mastered By – Herb Powers
Mixed By – Craig Burbidge (tracks: 13), Jean-Marie Horvat (tracks: 4–7, 11), Kevin Thomas (tracks: 3), Louil Silas, Jr.* (tracks: 2), Vassal Benford (tracks: 2), Victor Flores (tracks: 2, 8, 10, 12, 14)
Mixed By [Assistant] – David Betancourt (tracks: 4, 5, 7, 11), David Brooks (10) (tracks: 4, 5, 7, 11), Elliot Anders (tracks: 4, 5, 7, 11), Gregg Barrett (tracks: 13), Ray Silva (tracks: 13), Richard Horniblow (tracks: 3), Rolly Ladd (tracks: 2), Willie Will (tracks: 12)
Production Manager – Judi A. Acosta
Recorded By – Anthony "A.J." Jeffries (tracks: 13), Dave Reitazas (tracks: 10), Jean-Marie Horvat (tracks: 4–7, 11), Kevin Davis (tracks: 4, 5, 7, 11), Kevin Thomas (tracks: 3), Kuk (tracks: 4, 5, 7, 11), Laney Stewart (tracks: 4, 5, 7, 11), Victor Flores (tracks: 2, 8, 12, 14)
Recorded By [Assistant] – Paul Scalera (tracks: 4, 5, 7, 11), Recorded By [Vocals] – Scott Ralston (tracks: 3)

Charts

Weekly charts

Year-end charts

Singles

References

External links 
Albums by Aaron Hall at FM Music

1993 debut albums
Aaron Hall (singer) albums
MCA Records albums